The following are the national records in speed skating in Denmark maintained by Dansk Skøjte Union.

Men

Women

References
General
Danish records 3 July 2018 updated
Specific

External links
 Dansk Skøjte Union official website

National records in speed skating
Speed skating-related lists
Speed skating
Records
Speed skating